Gennady's Bible is the first full manuscript Bible in Old Church Slavonic, produced in 1490s. Gennady (1410–1505), Archbishop of Novgorod the Great and Pskov, set the task to collect all Bible translations in one book. Before him there were only separated and incomplete Slavonic translations of various Bible's books and chapters. So he and his assistants used in their work already existing Slavic Pentateuch, Judges, Joshua, Ruth, Kings, Job,  Zephaniah, Haggai, Zechariah, Malachi, Proverbs, Ecclesiastes, the Gospels, Acts, Epistles, Revelation, Psalms and some others. He translated missing books with the help of monk Veniamin from Latin Vulgata: Nehemiah, Ezra, Tobit, Judith, Esther, Jeremiah, Wisdom, 1 Maccabees, 2 Maccabees, 1 Esdras, 2 Esdras and some others. The Gennady's Bible was the main source of the first printed Slavic Ostrog Bible. Russian tsar Ivan IV sent at Ivan Fyodorov's request one exemplar to Ostrog.

Sources 
 

Bible translations into Church Slavonic
East Slavic manuscripts
15th-century biblical manuscripts
Illuminated biblical manuscripts
15th-century illuminated manuscripts
1490s works
15th century in Russia
1490s in Europe

Эта фото не библия Генадия, этж Син. препис 915.